Julia Dalkin (born 1975) is a British actress.

Partial filmography
Nebulous (radio) (2005–2008)
EastEnders - Polly (2009), DC Brook Penrith (2013)
Doctors - Suzanne Matthews (1 episode, 2008)
The Worst Journey in the World (2007) (TV) - Angela Turner 
Holby City - Nikki Taylor (1 episode, 2006)
A Touch of Frost - DC Bennett (1 episode, 2005)
Global Conspiracy (2004) - Janet 
Wire in the Blood - Librarian (1 episode, 2003)
The Bill - Christine Nelmes (1 episode, 2002)
Outside the Rules (2002) (TV) - Linda Bloor 
Life Support - Sharon Richards (1 episode, 1999)
Phantasmagoria - Hannah Fry (radio)
Inspector Morse - Rachel James (1 episode, Death Is Now My Neighbour, 1997)

External links

Julia Dalkin at Casting Call

1975 births
Living people
British actresses